Shivparvatia is a genus of flowering plants belonging to the family Caryophyllaceae.

The genus name of Shivparvatia refers to both the Hindu god Shiv and Parvati, the Hindu goddess of power, energy, nourishment, harmony, love, beauty, devotion, and motherhood. 

The genus was circumscribed by Prashant Keshav Pusalkar and Devendra Kumar Singh in J. Jap. Bot. vol.90 (Issue 2) on page 81 in 2015.

It is found in central China, the Himalayas, Nepal, Qinghai and Tibet.

Species:
Shivparvatia ciliolata 
Shivparvatia forrestii 
Shivparvatia glanduligera 
Shivparvatia ludlowii 
Shivparvatia melandryiformis 
Shivparvatia melandryoides 
Shivparvatia monantha 
Shivparvatia ramellata 
Shivparvatia rhodantha 
Shivparvatia stracheyi

References

Caryophyllaceae
Caryophyllaceae genera
Flora of North-Central China
Flora of Qinghai
Flora of South-Central China
Flora of Nepal
Flora of East Himalaya
Flora of West Himalaya